The 1990 Pan American Race Walking Cup was held in Xalapa, Veracruz, México, on 27–28 October.  The track of the Cup runs in the Paseo de los Lagos.

Complete results, medal winners until 2011, and the results for the Mexican athletes were published.

Medallists

Results

Men's 20 km

*: Started as a guest out of competition.

Team

Men's 50 km

*: Started as a guest out of competition.

Team

Women's 10 km

*: Started as a guest out of competition.

Team

Participation
The participation of 69 athletes (+ 16 guests) from 9 countries is reported.

 (2)
 (9)
 (8)
 (3)
 (2)
 (12)
 México (15)
 (3)
 (14)

See also
 1990 Race Walking Year Ranking

References

Pan American Race Walking Cup
Pan American Race Walking Cup
Pan American Race Walking Cup
International athletics competitions hosted by Mexico